Phonism I ( 幻听 I ) is a work
for 10 performers, composed by He Xuntian in 1989.

Summary
He Xuntian adopted RD Composition and Theory of Musical Dimension in his work Phonism I.

First performance
2 April 1991, Paradiso Amsterdam, Netherlands
Netherlands Nieow Ensemble

References

Compositions by He Xuntian
Chamber music compositions
1989 compositions